Arterial switch operation (ASO) or arterial switch, is an open heart surgical procedure used to correct dextro-transposition of the great arteries (d-TGA). 

Its development was pioneered by Canadian cardiac surgeon William Mustard and it was named for Brazilian cardiac surgeon Adib Jatene, who was the first to use it successfully. It was the first method of d-TGA repair to be attempted, but the last to be put into regular use because of technological limitations at the time of its conception.

Use of the arterial switch is historically preceded by two atrial switch methods: the Senning and Mustard procedures.

The atrial switch, which was an attempt to correct the physiology of transposition, had significant shortcomings. The arterial switch sought to address them. This has emerged as an anatomically as well as physiologically appropriate solution.

Timing
The Jatene procedure is ideally performed during the second week of life, before the left ventricle adjusts to the lower pulmonary pressure and is therefore unable to support the systemic circulation. In the event of sepsis or delayed diagnosis, a combination of pulmonary artery banding (PAB) and shunt construction may be used to increase the left ventricular mass sufficiently to make an arterial switch possible later in infancy.

Prognosis
The success of ASO procedure is largely dependent on the facilities available, the skill and experience of the surgeon, and the general health of the patient. Under preferable conditions, the intra-operative and post-operative success rate is 90% or more, with a comparable survival rate after 5 years. Approximately 10% of arterial switch recipients develop residual pulmonary stenosis post-operatively, which can lead to right heart failure if left untreated; treatment usually involves endovascular stenting and/or xenograft patching.

Overview
 General anaesthesia and cardiopulmonary bypass are used.
 The aorta and pulmonary artery are detached from their native roots and reattached to the opposite root; thus, the pulmonary root becomes the neo-aorta, and the aortic root becomes the neo-pulmonary artery.
 The coronary arteries are transplanted from the aorta/neo-pulmonary artery to the pulmonary artery/neo-aorta.
 Length of procedure, from initiation of anaesthesia to post-operative cease thereof, is approximately 6–8 hours.

Preparatory
If the procedure is anticipated far enough in advance (with prenatal diagnosis, for example), and the individual's blood type is known, a family member with a compatible blood type may donate some or all of the blood needed for transfusion during the use of a heart-lung machine (HLM). The patient's mother is normally unable to donate blood for the transfusion, as she will not be able to donate blood during pregnancy (due to the needs of the fetus) or for a few weeks after giving birth (due to blood loss), and the process of collecting a sufficient amount of blood may take several weeks to a few months. However, in cases where the individual has been diagnosed but surgery must be delayed, maternal (or even autologous, in certain cases) blood donation may be possible, as long as the mother has a compatible blood type. In most cases, though, the patient receives a donation from a blood bank. A blood transfusion is necessary for the arterial switch because the HLM needs its "circulation" filled with blood and an infant does not have enough blood on their own to do this (in most cases, an adult would not require blood transfusion).

The patient will require a number of imaging procedures in order to determine the individual anatomy of the great arteries and, most importantly, the coronary arteries. These may include angiography, magnetic resonance imaging (MRI), and/or computed tomography (CT scan). The coronary arteries are carefully mapped out in order to avoid unexpected intra-operative complications in transferring them from the native aorta to the neo-aorta.

Pre-operative
As with any procedure requiring general anaesthesia, arterial switch recipients will need to fast for several hours prior to the surgery to avoid the risk of aspiration of vomitus during the induction of anesthesia.

As the patient is anesthetized, they may receive the following drugs, which continue as necessary throughout the procedure:
 Inhalational anaesthetic
 muscle relaxant, to induce temporary paralysis
 opioid analgesic, to manage pain, cause sedation and induce serenity
 Aprotinin, or other antifibrinolytic, to prevent excessive bleeding
 Methylprednisolone, to reduce swelling and inflammation
 Prophylactic antibiotics, to prevent infection

Intra-operative

The heart is accessed via median sternotomy, and the patient is given heparin to prevent the blood from clotting. A generous section of pericardium is harvested, then disinfected and sterilized with a weak solution of glutaraldehyde; and the coronary and great artery anatomy are examined. The ductus arteriosus and right pulmonary branch, up to and including the first branches in the hilum of the right lung, are separated from the surrounding supportive tissue to allow mobility of the vessels. Silk marking sutures may be placed in the pulmonary trunk at this time, to indicate the commissure of the aorta to the neo-aorta; alternatively, this may be done later in the procedure.

The cardiopulmonary bypass is then initiated by inserting a cannula into the ascending aorta as distally from the aortic root as possible while still supplying all arterial branches, another cannula is inserted into the right atrium, and a vent is created for the left ventricle via catheterization of the right superior pulmonary vein. The HLM is started at a low-flow and the patient's body is cooled to a rectal temperature of 20 ° C (68 °F), which prevents the brain damage otherwise associated with the temporary circulatory arrest necessary during the procedure; the patient must be cooled for a minimum of 20 minutes prior to beginning the repair.

While the patient is cooling, the ductus arteriosus is ligated at both the aortic and pulmonary ostia, then transected at its center; the left pulmonary branch, including the first branches in the hilum of the left lung, is separated from the supportive tissue; and the aorta is marked at the site it will be transected, which is just below the pulmonary bifurcation, proximal to where the pulmonary artery will be transected.

When the patient is fully cooled, the ascending aorta is clamped as close as possible below the HLM cannula, and cardioplegia is achieved by delivering cold blood to the heart via the ascending aorta (below the cross clamp). The aorta is then transected at the marked spot, and the pulmonary artery is transected a few millimetres below the bifurcation. The vessels are again examined, and the pulmonary root is inspected for left ventricular outflow tract obstruction (LVOTO). If a ventricular septal defect (VSD) is present, it may be repaired, at this point via either the aortic or pulmonary valve; it may alternatively be repaired later in the procedure.

The great arteries are usually arranged using the LeCompte maneuver, with the aortic cross clamp positioned to hold the pulmonary artery anterior to the ascending aorta; though with some congenital arrangements of the great arteries, such as side-by-side, this is not possible and the arteries will be transplanted in the non-anatomic 'anterior aorta' arrangement. If the aortic commissure has not yet been marked, it may be done at this point, using the same method as would be used prior to bypass; however, there is a third opportunity for this still later in the procedure.

Coronary arteries are examined closely, and the ostia and proximal arterial course are identified, as are any infundibular branches, if they exist. The coronary ostia and a large "button" of surrounding aortic wall are then excised from the aorta, well into the sinus of Valsalva; and the proximal sections of the coronary arteries are separated from the surface of the heart, which prevents tension or distortion after anastomosis to the neo-aorta. Infundibular branches are sometimes unable to be spared, but this is a very rare occurrence. If the aortic commissure has not previously been marked, the excised coronary arteries will be used to determine the implantation position of the aorta.

The aorta is then transplanted onto the pulmonary root, using either absorbable or permanent continuous suture. The aortic clamp is temporarily removed while small sections of the neo-aorta are cut away to accommodate the coronary ostia, and a continuous absorbable suture is then used to anastomose each coronary "button" into the prepared space. In most cases, the coronary implantation sites will be at left and right anterior positions at the base of the neo-aorta; however, if the circumflex coronary artery branches from the right coronary artery, the circumflex coronary artery will be distorted if the pair are not implanted higher than normal on the neo-aorta, and in some cases they may need to be implanted above the aortic commissure, on the native aorta itself. The circumflex coronary artery may originate from the same coronary sinus as, rather than directly from, the right coronary artery, in which case they may still be excised on the same "button" and transplanted similarly to if they had a shared ostium, unless one or both have intramural communication with another coronary vessel. Sometimes, one or more coronary ostia are located very close to the valvular opening and a small portion of the native aortic valve must be removed when the coronary artery is excised, which causes a generally mild, and usually well-tolerated, neo-pulmonary valve regurgitation.

The HLM is turned off and the aortic and atrial cannula are removed, then an incision is made in the right atrium, through which the congenital or palliative atrial septal defect (ASD) is repaired; where a Rashkind balloon atrial septostomy was used, the ASD should be able to be closed with sutures, but cases involving large congenital ASDs or Blalock-Hanlon atrial septectomy, a pericardial, xenograft, or Dacron patch may be necessary. If there is a VSD which has not yet been repaired, this is performed via the atrial incision and tricuspid valve, using sutures for a small defect or a patch for a large defect.

When the septal defects have been repaired and the atrial incision is closed, the previously removed cannula are replaced and the HLM is restarted. The left ventricle is then vented and the cross clamp removed from the aorta, enabling full-flow to be re-established and rewarming to begin; at this point the patient will receive an additional dose of Regitine to keep blood pressure under control. The previously harvested pericardium is then used to patch the coronary explantation sites, and to extend - and widen, if necessary -  the neo-pulmonary root, which allows the pulmonary artery to be anastamosed without residual tension; the pulmonary artery is then transplanted to the neo-pulmonary root.

Final stages
The patient is fitted with chest tubes, temporary pacemaker leads, and ventilated before weaning from the HLM is begun.
 inotrope, to assist the heart in contracting adequately
The rib cage is relaxed and the external surgical wound is bandaged, but the sternum and chest incision are left open to provide extra room in the pleural cavity, allowing the heart room to swell and preventing pressure caused by pleural effusion.

Post-operative
The sternum and chest can usually be closed within a few days; however, the chest tubes, pacemaker, ventilator, and drugs may still be required after this time. The patient will continue to fast for up to a few days, and breastmilk or infant formula can then be gradually introduced via nasogastric tube (NG tube); the primary goal after a successful arterial switch, and before hospital discharge, is for the infant to gain back the weight they have lost and continue to gain weight at a normal or near-normal rate.

History
Scottish pathologist Matthew Baillie first described TGA in 1797, presumably as a posthumous diagnosis. Without surgical correction, preoperative mortality in the neonate is approximately 30% within the first week of life and up to 90% within the first year; the survivors would have been those with one or more concomitant intracardiac shunts (ASD, patent ductus arteriosus (PDA), patent foramen ovale (PFO), and/or VSD), and are unlikely to have survived past adolescence.

In 1950, American surgeons Alfred Blalock and C. Rollins Hanlon introduced the Blalock-Hanlon atrial septectomy, which was then routinely used to palliate patients. This would have effectively reduced early mortality rates, particularly in cases with no concomitant shunts, but is unlikely to have reduced late mortality rates.

Mustard first conceived of, and attempted, the anatomical repair (arterial switch) for d-TGA in the early 1950s. His few attempts were unsuccessful due to technical difficulties posed by the translocation of the coronary arteries, and the idea was abandoned.

Swedish cardiac surgeon Åke Senning described the first corrective surgery for d-TGA (the Senning procedure) in 1959, which involved using the atrial septum to create an intratrial baffle that redirected bloodflow at the atrial level; Senning yielded a high success rate using this procedure, significantly lowering both early and late mortality rates.

Due to the technical complexity of the Senning procedure, others could not duplicate his success rate; in response, Mustard developed a simpler alternative method (the Mustard procedure) in 1964, which involved constructing a baffle from autologous pericardium or synthetic material, such as Dacron. This procedure yielded early and late mortality rates comparable to the Senning procedure; however, a late morbidity rate was eventually discovered in relation to the use of synthetic graft material, which does not grow with the recipient and eventually causes obstruction.

In 1966, American surgeons William Rashkind and William Miller transformed the palliation of d-TGA patients with the innovative Rashkind balloon atrial septostomy, which, unlike the thoracotomy required by a septectomy, is performed through the minimally invasive surgical technique of cardiac catheterization.

The first successful arterial switch was performed on a forty-two-day-old d-TGA + VSD infant by Jatene in 1975. Egyptian cardiac surgeon Magdi Yacoub was subsequently successful in treating TGA with AN intact interventricular septum when preceded by pulmonary artery banding and systemic-to-pulmonary shunt palliation. Austrian surgeon B. Eber was the first to recount a small series of successful arterial switch procedures, and the first large successful series was reported by Guatemalan surgeon Aldo R. Casteneda. In the postoperative period, increased incidence and degree of supravalvular pulmonary stenosis. Eliminating the pericardial patch for pulmonary artery reconstruction and using a direct connection reduced the incidence of this complication.

By 1991, the arterial switch had become the procedure of choice, and it remains the standard modern procedure for d-TGA repair.

As long-term results of arterial switch are being reported, newer sets of potential surgical problems are becoming evident. Progressive neo-aortic dilation (pulmonary valve at birth) has been observed. However, this dilation does not necessarily translate into aortic regurgitation (AR) and need for surgery in all patients. Older age at time of ASO, presence of ventricular septal defect, and previous PA banding have been found to be risk factors for AR. supravalvular pulmonary stenosis was commonly observed in the postoperative period. A direct connection of the pulmonary artery reduced the incidence of this complication 

The world's smallest infant to survive an arterial switch was Jerrick De Leon, born 13 weeks premature. At the time of the operation on February 6, 2005, he weighed just over 1.5 pounds (700 grams).

References

External links
 The cardiothoracic surgery network (CTSNet): Transposition of Great Vessels
 Inova Heart and Vascular Institute: Arterial Switch for TGA
 Med-Lib: Transposition of the great arteries
 PediHeart: The Arterial Switch Operation

Cardiac surgery